Michele Denise Bruniges  (born 1 June 1957) is an Australian teacher and education administrator. In April 2016 she began her role as Secretary of the Australian Government Department of Education and Training.

Bruniges has a Doctorate of Philosophy in Educational Measurement, a master's degree in Education from the University of New South Wales, a Graduate Diploma in Educational Studies and a Diploma in Teaching from the Goulburn College of Advanced Education.

Career
Bruniges began her teaching career in 1980 at Leppington Public School prior to becoming a high school teacher of Mathematics and Computing at St Johns Park High School and Ingleburn High School. She also taught in TAFE NSW and the Adult Migrant Education Service.

From 2005 to 2008 Bruniges was Chief Executive of the Australian Capital Territory ACT Department of Education and Training. She held various Federal positions with the Department of Education, Employment and Workplace Relations (DEEWR), including Deputy Secretary for the Office of Early Childhood Education and Child Care; Deputy Secretary, Schools and Associate Secretary, Schools and Youth.

She was appointed as Director-General of the NSW Department of Education and Training in July 2011 and commenced on 7 September 2011.

From 2012 to 2015 Bruniges was also an Honorary Adjunct Professor of Education in the Faculty of Arts and Social Sciences at the University of New South Wales.

In March 2016, Prime Minister Malcolm Turnbull announced Bruniges' appointment as the Secretary of the Australian Government Department of Education and Training. Since February 2020, the department has been known as Department of Education, Skills and Employment.

Honours
Member of the Order of Australia (AM), 26 January 2012.
For service to public administration through executive roles, and as a contributor to reform in the education sector at state and national levels.
Presidential Citation, Australian Council for Educational Leaders (ACEL), 2011.
For high level leadership of public education.
Fellow of the Australian College of Educators (FACE), 2009.
For a distinguished career in educational leadership and management and in particular valued and well respected contributions to school education sustained over many years.
Churchill Fellowship, 2000.
To investigate ways to monitor, analyse and report progress in student achievement in the US and The Netherlands.

References

1957 births
Living people
Australian schoolteachers
Computer science educators
Mathematics educators
University of New South Wales alumni
Members of the Order of Australia
Secretaries of the Australian Government Education Department